The Speaker of the National Parliament is the Speaker of the National Parliament of the Solomon Islands. The position was established under section 64 of the Constitution of the Solomon Islands of 1978, when the country became independent from the United Kingdom. It is similar to the position of Speaker of the House of Commons in the U.K.; the Solomon Islands is a Commonwealth realm and maintains a Westminster system of government.

The Speaker is elected to the post by Members of Parliament every four years, as mandated by Order 5 of the Standing Orders of the National Parliament. The latter Order stipulates that "Every citizen of Solomon Islands over the age of twenty-one and who is otherwise qualified for election as a Member shall be eligible for election as Speaker". Thus the Speaker is not necessarily chosen from among sitting MPs, unlike the procedure governing the election of the Speaker in the United Kingdom. Indeed, Peter Kenilorea was not an MP when he was elected Speaker in 2001, and Allan Kemakeza was elected Speaker after failing to retain his seat in Parliament in the 2010 general election. The only person so far to have been a sitting MP when elected Speaker was Waita Ben Tabusasi, in 1989. He vacated his seat as MP for North East Guadalcanal upon assuming the duties of Speaker; the resulting by-election led to Hilda Kari becoming the first ever woman in the Solomon Islands Parliament.

The speaker's role, as per section 65 of the Constitution, is to "preside at any sitting of Parliament". The speaker is expected to  "ensure that Members conduct themselves in accordance to the Standing Orders of National Parliament".

Presidents of the Legislative Council of the Solomon Islands

The President of the Legislative Council of the Solomon Islands (1960–1970) was the High Commissioner for the Western Pacific.

Chairmen of the Governing Council

Speaker of the Legislative Assembly

Speakers of the National Parliament

The following MPs have served as Speaker since the First Parliament in 1978.

Deputy Speaker

The Constitution also provides for a deputy speaker. Per article 64, the Deputy Speaker is elected by Parliament from among its members, whereas the speaker may be elected from outside Parliament. A deputy speaker who becomes speaker must vacate their seat in parliament. The leader of a political party in Parliament may not serve as deputy speaker.

The deputy speaker carries out the functions of the speaker if the latter is unable to do so. However, per article 71 of the Constitution, while the speaker has "neither an original nor a casting vote", the deputy speaker, when presiding Parliament, may not cast an original vote but "shall exercise a casting vote if on any question the votes are equally divided".

Job Dudley Tausinga, Rural Advancement Party MP for North New Georgia was elected unopposed to the position on 6 December 2011 following the resignation of Namson Tran, independent MP for West Honiara. Tausinga, a veteran MP, lost his seat in the 2014 general election. John Moffat Fugui, Independent MP for Central Honiara, was elected Deputy Speaker on 17 December 2014, with 29 votes to David Tome's 21.

References

 
Solomon Islands
1978 establishments in the Solomon Islands